Harburn railway station was situated on the Caledonian Railway line between Carstairs railway station and Edinburgh.

It was closed in 1966 by the Beeching Axe.

References

Disused railway stations in West Lothian
Former Caledonian Railway stations
Beeching closures in Scotland
Railway stations in Great Britain opened in 1848
Railway stations in Great Britain closed in 1966